Felipe Sobrepeña Calusa (born May 1, 1940, in Pangasinan, Philippines) is a Filipino comics artist.

Early life
Sobrepeña was born in 1940 in Pangasinan, the only child of Rufino Calusa and Teofila Sobrepeña. His mother died during World War II when he was a year old and his father was always working in the woods because of the war, so he was left in the care of aunts and relatives.

After the war, his father began a job as a messenger at a post office in Manila, and took him to live there. Sobrepeña spent most of his teenage life at the Quezon City High School in Kamuning, Quezon City. After high school, he took up Fine Arts at the University of the Philippines in Diliman. While in college, he also worked as an illustrator at a local bookstore, providing the drawings for textbooks used in elementary and high schools.

Comic art 
After graduating from college, he got a small job at a local publishing company, drawing the characters of Francisco Balagtas' novel Florante at Laura. He then applied as an illustrator at several comic book publishers including Graphic Arts Services, Inc. (GASI), Atlas Publication, Islas Filipinas Publishing Company and ACE Publication, working in the industry for many years. He was given an award for "Best Komiks Illustrator" for his illustrations on the cover of Lovelife Komiks.

Among his works were Karpov, Darmo Kandado, Vertud and Children's Bible sa Wikang Filipino.

References 

1940 births
Living people
Artists from Pangasinan
Filipino comics artists
Filipino illustrators
University of the Philippines Diliman alumni